Yanashallash, Yanashalla, or Yanashayash (in the regional Quechua spellings, yana black, salla large cliff of gravel; bride, girlfriend, lover, aya corpse, "black cliff of gravel", "black bride" or "black corpse") is a mountain in the north of the Wallanka mountain range in the Andes of Peru, about  high.

It connects the towns of Chiquián and Huallanca. The mountain and the pass are located in the Ancash Region, Bolognesi Province, in the districts of Aquia and Huallanca.

Sources 

Mountains of Peru
Mountains of Ancash Region
Mountain passes of the Andes